Gary Winnick is an American financier best known as the founder of Global Crossing and Chairman between 1997 and 2002, when the company declared bankruptcy.

As of 2015, Winnick was Chairman and Chief Executive Officer of Winnick & Company, a Los Angeles-based private investment firm founded in 1985. In 1999, Winnick was listed by the Los Angeles Business Journal as the wealthiest Angeleno with a net worth of more than $6 billion; as of 2002 his net worth was listed at $900 million. In 2021, Winnick was named one of the LA500 by the journal.

The Winnick Family Foundation has funded scholarships at Stanford University, Cornell University, Brown University, Tufts University and LIU Post, and endowed a faculty position at Columbia University.

Early life 
Winnick was born to a Jewish family in 1947 and grew up in New York, New York. His father owned a restaurant-supply business. When he was 16, Winnick got his first job at a Howard Johnson's on Northern Boulevard. He graduated from the C.W. Post University, part of Long Island University, in 1969.

Career

Drexel Burnham Lambert 
Winnick joined Drexel Burnham in 1972. There he was senior vice president and a partner of Michael Milken.

Winnick & Company 

In 1985, Winnick formed Pacific Capital Group, a private investment firm focused on private equity and restructuring. In 2013 the name of Pacific Capital Group changed to Winnick & Company.

Global Crossing Limited 
In 1997, Winnick founded Global Crossing Limited. Global Crossing laid the first privately financed underwater fiber optic cable network across the Atlantic Ocean, and partnered with Microsoft and Softbank Corp. to build a high capacity telecommunications network. The company succeeded in laying cables between North America, Europe and Asia to create a network that, at the time, represented 20% of all undersea capacity leaving the United States. The company, for which Winnick served as Chairman, went public in 1998. Global Crossing was profitable its first year in operation. As of April 1999, Winnick had amassed the fastest billion dollar fortune in history with $4.5 billion in 18 months . He reached the mark faster than Jeff Bezos (4 years), Mark Zuckerberg (4 years) and Bill Gates (12 years) but slower than Jay S. Walker (1 year) who has surpassed him as soon as July 1999.

In January 2002, Global Crossing reorganized under Chapter 11 bankruptcy protection and announced that Singapore Technologies Telemedia would take a controlling interest in the company. Winnick created a $3.5 billion cash tender for the stock of Global Crossing, which was the largest offer in the industry at that time. At that time, the Global Crossing bankruptcy was the largest for a U.S. telecom company, and the fifth largest for any U.S. company in history.

Winnick resigned as Chairman of Global Crossing in December 2002. Global Crossing insider sales were approximately $150 million in 2001. Of the total amount sold by company executives and directors since 1999, around $735 million was sold by Winnick, both directly and through foundations. Winnick donated $25 million to Global Crossing employees who lost money in the company's 401k retirement plan.

Philanthropy 
Winnick founded The Winnick Family Foundation in 1983. As Chairman, he funds such initiatives as The Winnick Family Clinical Research Center at Cedars-Sinai Medical Center and The Winnick International Conference Center of the Simon Wiesenthal Center, Jerusalem. He has endowed a Winnick Faculty Scholar at the Graduate School of Business at Stanford University. Winnick serves on several boards, including The Museum of Modern Art and Hillel International.

In 2000, he promised $10 millions to Long Island University for scholarships and to restore the mansion in the CW Post Campus. Among the grantees the foundation supports are the Winnick Popular Library at the Los Angeles Central Library, the Los Angeles Police Foundation, the Winnick Family Children's Zoo in Los Angeles Zoo, Skirball Cultural Center's Winnick Hall, and the Jewish Federation of Greater Los Angeles.

Personal life 
He received an honorary doctorate from his alma mater, C.W. Post Campus, in 2004. He and his wife, Karen Beth Winnick, have three sons. His wife is an author, illustrator, and publisher of children's books. According to the Center for Investigative Reporting, Winnick is the owner of the 28,000-square-foot "Bellagio House" near the Bel-Air Country Club.

References

External links 
Radsoft Fibergate: Gary Winnick
The 2000 Slate 60: The 60 largest American charitable contributions of 2000

1948 births
Living people
Jewish American philanthropists
American businesspeople
Drexel Burnham Lambert
21st-century American Jews